Holiday Special may refer to:

 Christmas special, a TV special broadcast during the holiday season
 "Holiday Special" (South Park), a 2017 TV episode
 Star Wars Holiday Special, a 1978 TV special